The Dosse is a river in the district of Ostprignitz-Ruppin in the northwestern part of Brandenburg, Germany. It is a right tributary of the Havel in Saxony-Anhalt.

It flows generally south, through Wittstock, Wusterhausen and Neustadt an der Dosse, before joining the Havel near Havelberg in Saxony-Anhalt.

With the town of Wittstock on its banks, the Dosse was the site of the 1636 Battle of Wittstock between Sweden and an alliance between Imperial and Saxon troops during the Thirty Years' War.

See also

List of rivers of Brandenburg
List of rivers of Saxony-Anhalt

Rivers of Brandenburg
Rivers of Saxony-Anhalt
Rivers of Germany